Plodder Lane railway station served the southern part of Bolton and the western, Highfield, part of Farnworth.

The station was located on the southern side of a bridge carrying Plodder Lane, the present B6199. The wooden station building was at road level with steps down to both platforms.

Plodder Lane station was on the London and North Western Railway route between Bolton Great Moor Street and Manchester Exchange.

History
The station opened on 1 April 1875 and was sometimes known as Plodder Lane for Farnworth. There was a nearby locomotive shed, also named Plodder Lane.

The station closed on 29 March 1954 and was demolished in the Winter of 1955–56.

The cutting that the station was in is still visible today and a footpath runs between the station site and Highfield Road. The site of the adjacent Engine Shed and Goods Yard was covered by housing although the path that led from Plodder Lane to Minerva Road survives and much of the exterior wall of the shed site is still in situ.

References

Sources

External links
 The station on a 1948 OS map via npe maps
 The station on an 1885 series OS map overlay via National Library of Scotland
 The station and line via railwaycodes

Disused railway stations in the Metropolitan Borough of Bolton
Former London and North Western Railway stations
Railway stations in Great Britain opened in 1875
Railway stations in Great Britain closed in 1954